The General Mihajlo Apostolski Military Academy  is  the main educational institution for officers of the Army of North Macedonia, located in Skopje.

History 
Three years of preparation preceded the Academy's founding. It was established on 7 June 1995 with the ratification of the Law on the Military Academy by the Assembly of North Macedonia, with the first class of cadets entering the academy on 25 September 1995. In 1996 the Academy received the name "General Mihajlo Apostolski" Military Academy (after Colonel general Mihajlo Apostolski, leader of the Macedonian partisans, which fought against Axis powers during the National Liberation War of Macedonia, 1941-45). The Military Academy is defined as a military higher education and research institution, according to the law, and its activities are in accordance with the Law on Higher Education and Law on scientific research in the country.

In the academic year 2003-04 not accept cadets for undergraduate studies. In December 2008, the government decided to restart the work of the Military Academy as a part of the Goce Delčev University (Štip), and in September 2009, after restarting its function, the Military Academy has been received and a new class of cadets.

Sources 

 Macedonian Wikipedia

External links 
Official website

Education in Skopje
Military academies